Henry Howard, 12th Earl of Suffolk, 5th Earl of Berkshire, KG, PC (16 May 1739 – 7 March 1779), was a British politician, styled Viscount Andover from 1756 to 1757.

Educated at Eton and Magdalen College, Oxford, he succeeded his grandfather as Earl of Suffolk in 1757. He was awarded a MA degree from Oxford in 1759 and a DCL degree in 1761. He was High Steward of Malmesbury from 1763 to 1767, and Deputy Earl Marshal from 1763 to 1765. On 25 May 1764, he married Hon. Maria Constantia Hampden-Trevor, daughter of Robert Hampden-Trevor, 1st Viscount Hampden, who died on 7 February 1767 giving birth to their only child: 
Maria Constantia Howard (7 February 1767 – 21 July 1775)

In 1771, he was appointed a Privy Counsellor (PC) and briefly served as Lord Privy Seal before becoming Secretary of State for the Northern Department under Lord North from 1771 to 1779. In this capacity, he secured the use of Hessian and Hanoverian mercenaries to help suppress the American Revolution. In the same capacity he helped to secure the survival of Sweden as an independent nation by counteracting Russia's plan to undo the Revolution of Gustavus III in 1772. He was made a Knight of the Garter (KG) in 1778.

On 14 August 1777, Suffolk married Lady Charlotte Finch, daughter of Heneage Finch, 3rd Earl of Aylesford, by whom he had two children:
George Howard, Viscount Andover (September 1778 – 27 December 1778)
Henry Howard, 13th Earl of Suffolk (8 August 1779 – 10 August 1779)

He died on 7 March 1779; his posthumous son Henry succeeded him for two days in August.

He is buried in Charlton Church, Wiltshire, together with his first wife.

References
Oxford Dictionary of National Biography, Howard, Henry, twelfth earl of Suffolk and fifth earl of Berkshire (1739–1779), politician, by Peter D. G. Thomas

1739 births
1779 deaths
Alumni of Magdalen College, Oxford
British Secretaries of State
Lords Privy Seal
Henry
Henry
Henry Howard, 12th Earl of Suffolk
Knights of the Garter
People educated at Eton College
Leaders of the House of Lords